Freestyle skiing at the 2023 Winter World University Games was held at Gore Mountain from 15 to 20 January 2023.

Men's events

Women's events

Medal table

Participating nations

  (1)
  (2)
  (1)
  (4)
  (3)
  (1)
  (3)
  (5)
  (4)
  (3)
  (1)
  (3)
  (1)
  (1)

References

External links
Freestyle & Freeski lakeplacid2023.com
Results book

2023 Winter World University Games
2023
2023 in freestyle skiing